Parkridge is a residential community in western Saskatoon, Saskatchewan, located on land annexed by the city between 1975 and 1979.  Development of the subdivision (initially called "Fairhaven II" after the neighbouring community to the east), began in the early 1980s. The extreme west end of the neighbourhood remained undeveloped until the subsequent creation of the adjacent Blairmore Suburban Centre led to the final phase of Parkridge being built out in the early 2010s. Whereas the majority of residents are employed in the sales and service sector, the next highest employer is business, finance and administration.  The two main age groups are those in their 40s and teenagers as of 2005.  Until recently Parkridge was the farthest western neighbourhood of Saskatoon south of 22nd Street.  However, new construction will soon see Neighbourhood 2 of the Blairmore SDA bear that claim to fame.  In comparison, the neighbourhood of Parkridge with a 2001 census population of 4,505 is larger than the Saskatchewan city of Melville which had a population of  4,149 in 2006, and 4,453 in 2001 and Parkridge is a little smaller than the provincial city of Humboldt which was 4,998 in 2006, and  5,161 in 2001.  In Saskatchewan rural towns must maintain a population above 5,000 to apply for city status. According to MLS data, the average sale price of a home as of 2013 was $327,072.

History
The roadways are to the most part named after those people who contributed significantly to the City of Saskatoon.

Education

James L. Alexander School - public elementary, part of the Saskatoon Public School Division
St. Marguerite School - separate (Catholic) elementary, part of Greater Saskatoon Catholic Schools
Two high schools, Tommy Douglas Collegiate and Bethlehem Catholic High School, are located in the nearby Blairmore Suburban Centre.

Area Parks
Parkridge Park  
James Girgulis Park  18.04 acres

Parkridge is serviced by two Saskatoon Transit  routes: Route #9 (Riversdale/CityCenter) services the neighbourhood boundary on Fairlight Drive while Route #5 (McComack/City Center) goes west on McCormack Road.

Government and politics
Parkridge exists within the federal electoral district of Saskatoon West. It is currently represented by Brad Redekopp of the Conservative Party of Canada, first elected in 2019.

Provincially, the area is within the constituency of Saskatoon Fairview. It is currently represented by Vicki Mowat of the Saskatchewan New Democratic Party, first elected in a 2017 by-election.

In Saskatoon's non-partisan municipal politics, Parkridge lies within ward 3. It is currently represented by Ann Iwanchuk, first elected in 2011.

Layout

Parkridge goes no further west than Highway 7.  22nd Street is the northernmost limit for this neighbourhood.  CPR rail line is as far south as this neighbourhood will venture.  Fairlight Drive creates a curved eastern boundary. The neighbourhood is of uneven shape, and even though there are main thoroughfares west, south and north, the community nestles around Parkridge Park with courts and crescents.  Parkridge Park is centrally located with James L. Alexander School at the north end, and St. Marguerite School at the south end of the park. The community's main access road, McCormack Road, winds through the district. In 2009, the city honored a request to convert the Kinloch development from a crescent to two cul-de-sac streets.

Shopping

The neighbouring subdivision of Fairhaven hosts a few neighbourhood convenience stores, and a strip mall alongside Confederation Inn. Major commercial development, including hotels and big-box retail, is available in the Blairmore Suburban Centre to the immediate northwest. Additional commercial services are to the northeast in the Confederation Suburban Centre. Confederation Mall is the closest enclosed shopping centre.

Amenities
The Shaw Centre recreation facility is located to the north of Parkridge in the Blairmore Suburban Centre.

Parkridge Centre is a long-term care facility for 240 residents who vary in age from pre-school to elderly.

References

External links

Local Area Planning
Saskatoon Neighbourhoods Word Search Puzzle
City of Saskatoon City of Saskatoon · Departments · Community Services · City Planning · ZAM Maps
 Populace Spring 2006

Neighbourhoods in Saskatoon